Frankenstein's Army is a 2013 found footage horror film directed by Richard Raaphorst, written by Chris W. Mitchell and Miguel Tejada-Flores, and starring Karel Roden, Joshua Sasse, Luke Newberry, Alexander Mercury, Robert Gwilym, Andrei Zayats, Mark Stevenson and Hon Ping Tang. An international co-production of the United States, the Czech Republic, and the Netherlands, the film is set on the Eastern Front of World War II, as seen from the point of view of a Red Army team. In the film, Soviet troops invading Germany encounter undead mechanical soldiers created by a mad scientist descended from Victor Frankenstein.

Plot 
During the closing days of World War II, a Soviet reconnaissance team consisting of Novikov, Sergei, Vassili, Alexei, Ivan, Sacha, and propagandist videographer Dmitri are on a mission to destroy a German sniper nest. After completing the objective, the squad receives a Soviet distress call that repeats without any response to their queries; at the same time, they lose radio contact with high command. Although the soldiers are skeptical of the presence of Soviet forces in the area, the team leader Novikov orders them to investigate. Meanwhile, Dmitri interviews the soldiers and documents the mission under orders to create a Soviet propaganda film featuring the heroic exploits of the Red Army.

As they draw closer to the designated coordinates, Dmitri takes an interest in, and films, several odd occurrences, such as unexplained dead Nazis, a burnt convent full of massacred nuns, and strange machinery. When the soldiers arrive at their destination, they find an abandoned church where they accidentally activate a 'zombot' - a reanimated corpse with mechanical implants fused onto its body. The zombot kills Novikov by disemboweling him before being killed by the rest of the men. Following this, Sergei takes charge as the new commander and though Vassili challenges his authority, the rest of the squad sides with Sergei.

The soldiers see an elderly caretaker enter the church and ambush him. He is interrogated by Dmitri, who asks for the location of the stranded Soviet soldiers they heard on the radio. The caretaker insists that the village is abandoned, with everyone killed or scared off by the creatures created by "The Doctor", but Vassili becomes impatient and cuts off his finger. Coerced by the torture, the caretaker agrees to lead them to the source of the Soviet distress call, but instead leads them into a zombot trap where Ivan is mortally wounded. The squad manages to escape, and back at the church they encounter a group of German survivors - Fritz, young boy Hans, and nurse Eva - that had been hiding from the zombots. Vassili suggests killing them, but Eva convinces the Russians to spare her and her fellow survivors by offering to help the wounded Ivan. When she is unable to save him and he dies of his injuries, Vassili attacks her and knocks her unconscious. Suddenly, Alexei is ambushed and killed by a zombot as more enter the church and close in on the group.

The survivors manage to escape into the church's catacombs, where Sergei discovers that Dmitri has been deceiving the squad by using a radio jammer to both block contact with high command and transmit the fake distress call they received. Dmitri reveals that he has a secret mission from the Soviet government to capture or kill the Nazi scientist who created the zombots, and to document their mission in case they cannot capture him. Furious that they were deceived and led unprepared into this mission, Sergei and Vassili threaten to kill Dmitri, but he asserts his authority by revealing that he is a Captain in the Red Army, outranking both of them, and threatens their families with retribution. As Dmitri leads the group deeper into the catacombs, they encounter increasingly bizarre aberrations and eventually find a chute which goes deeper into the factory. Sergei and Vassili force Hans to go down the chute to investigate and the boy is quickly killed by a zombot which then climbs up the chute and attacks the group; though they manage to destroy it, Fritz is killed in the struggle. Sergei, Vassili, and Sacha then stage a mutiny against Dmitri and throw him and his film equipment down the chute.

Unable to climb back up, Dmitri goes deeper into the facility, eventually being discovered and chased by a multitude of zombots. While trying to escape, he encounters, and is knocked out by, Ivan who has been converted into a zombot. When Dmitri regains consciousness, he finds himself taken prisoner by the caretaker, who reveals himself to be Dr. Viktor Frankenstein, a deranged descendant of the original Victor Frankenstein, and creator of the zombots. The doctor gives Dmitri a tour of his facility, explaining how he created the zombots based on his grandfather's work, and how he went rogue from his Nazi superiors. Along the way, Dmitri sees Hans, converted into a zombot, and Sergei and Vassili, both captured, with the latter partially dismembered. Dmitri and Frankenstein then hear distant artillery fire, which Dmitri reveals is the approaching Red Army. Dmitri attempts to recruit Frankenstein on behalf of the Soviet government, but instead, he proposes an experiment that he believes will end the war: fusing together one half each of a Soviet and a Nazi brain. To this end, Frankenstein lobotomizes a kidnapped Nazi soldier, and then Sergei, who swears revenge on Dmitri before Frankenstein begins operating on him; during the surgery, Frankenstein is assisted by Eva, who has also been turned into a zombot. Frankenstein removes half of Sergei's brain and grafts the removed half of the Nazi soldier's brain into Sergei's head and then reanimates him with his generator. Frankenstein restrains Dmitri onto a table to begin experimenting on him, but the Red Army's artillery suddenly begins bombarding the factory. Frankenstein quickly gathers his documents and prepares to flee, but Sacha, who managed to evade capture, appears from behind and shoots him dead. Dmitri orders Sacha to free him, but Sacha ignores him, instead removing Frankenstein's head and taking it with him as proof that he succeeded in his mission, along with Dmitri's camera. Sacha flees the facility just as Sergei's body comes to life and kills Dmitri.

The "document" then ends with a photo of a newly promoted Sacha standing next to Stalin.

Cast 
 Karel Roden as Dr. Viktor Frankenstein
 Alexander Mercury as Dmitri
 Joshua Sasse as Sergei
 Andrei Zayats as Vassili
 Hon Ping Tang as Ivan, "Ivan Zombot"
 Mark Stevenson as Alexei
 Luke Newberry as Sacha
 Robert Gwilym as Novikov
 Cristina Catalina as Eva, "Nurse Zombot"
 Zdenek Barinka as Hans, "Pod Zombot"
 Jan de Lukowicz as Fritz
 Klaus Lucas as Dieter, The Dying Nazi Officer

Production 
Stories of Frankenstein's monster disturbed director Richard Raaphorst as a child. When he was thinking of ideas for a monster film, he instantly went back to the Frankenstein mythology, which he extended to World War II. Raaphorst said he was drawn the idea of an army of Frankensteins in World War II specifically because the idea was "insane". Raaphorst had worked on a similar film titled Worst Case Scenario but Frankenstein's Army is unrelated to it.

Principal photography began on March 5, 2012 at Karlovy Vary in Czechia. Although the film used CGI, most of the effects were practical; for example, stuntmen were set on fire. The practical effects, inspired by John Carpenter's The Thing, necessitated what Raaphorst described as long, complicated single takes. He said it was worth it in the end, though he experienced doubt during shooting when he became ill.

Release 
Frankenstein's Army premiered at the International Film Festival Rotterdam on January 26, 2013. It was released in the United States on July 26, 2013. MPI Media Group and Dark Sky released it on home video on September 10, 2013.

Reception 
On review aggregator Rotten Tomatoes, Frankenstein's Army holds an approval rating of 56% of 25 critics, and an average rating of 5.47/10. Metacritic, which assigns a normalized score, rated it 49 out of 100 based on nine reviews.

Scott Foundas of Variety wrote that the film is "short on plot and long on ingeniously gruesome creature designs and practical special effects that hark back to the industrious 1980s schlockfests churned out by the likes of Frank Henenlotter and Stuart Gordon." Foundas also compared the film's "junkyard chic" to the steampunk films of Shinya Tsukamoto. John DeFore of The Hollywood Reporter wrote that the film's monsters and gory special effects will appeal to horror fans, but it should have focused more on black humor and satire to appeal to broader midnight movie audiences. Andy Webster of The New York Times described the monsters as steampunk cyborgs and wrote, "Narrative depth may be in short supply, but the energy, invention and humor are bracing."

Ignatiy Vishnevetsky of The A.V. Club rated it C− and called it "a ludicrous World War II horror flick bogged down by its found-footage gimmick" that only works near the end when the film plays up the "imaginatively grotesque monsters". Jason Jenkins of Dread Central rated it 3 out of 5 stars and called it "a fun, furious, goofy and gory good time" for forgiving horror fans. Lauren Taylor of Bloody Disgusting rated it 1.5 out of 5 stars and said that the visuals and effects did not make up for the lack of a plot and unnecessary "found footage" style.  Bill Gibron of PopMatters called it "an amazing steampunk splatter fest" whose visual imagery makes up for its narrative faults.

See also 
 List of films featuring Frankenstein's monster

References

External links 

 
 
 

2013 films
2013 horror films
2010s comedy horror films
2010s monster movies
American comedy horror films
American action horror films
American robot films
American zombie films
Czech action horror films
Cyborg films
Dieselpunk
Dutch action films
Dutch horror films
Films set in 1945
Films set in Germany
Films shot in the Czech Republic
Found footage films
Frankenstein films
Nazi zombie films
Steampunk films
2010s science fiction films
American science fiction action films
Czech science fiction action films
American science fiction horror films
Dutch war films
Czech war films
Horror war films
English-language Czech films
English-language Dutch films
2013 comedy films
American World War II films
Czech World War II films
Dutch World War II films
Eastern Front of World War II films
Films about the Soviet Union in the Stalin era
2010s exploitation films
2010s English-language films
2010s American films